Washam is a surname. Notable people with the surname include:

Ben Washam (1915–1984), American animator
Jo Ann Washam (1950–2019), American professional golfer 
Rey Washam (born 1961), American drummer
Wisner Washam (born 1931), American soap opera writer